This is a list of airports that Thai Airways International flies. Currently they service 40 international destinations from their hub at Bangkok.

Thai Airways International destinations

Thai Smile destinations

References

External links
Our Network (worldwide) - Thai Airways International
Worldwide Destinations - Thai Airways International

Thai Airways International
Lists of airline destinations
Star Alliance destinations